Ariake-Tennis-no-mori Station is a train station in Kōtō, Tokyo Prefecture, Japan. Its station number is U-13. The station opened on 27 March 2006.

The name of this station translated means "Ariake Tennis Forest", a likely reference to the Ariake Tennis no Mori Park which is where the Japan Open Tennis Championship is held.

Station layout
The station consists of an elevated island platform.

External links
 Official information site

Railway stations in Tokyo
Railway stations in Japan opened in 2006
Yurikamome